The Kölner Herbst-Stuten-Meile was a Group 3 flat horse race in Germany open to thoroughbred fillies and mares aged three years or older. It was run at Cologne over a distance of 1,600 metres (about 1 mile), and it was scheduled to take place each year in November.

The event was established in 2000, and it was initially classed at Listed level. It was promoted to Group 3 status in 2005.

The Kölner Herbst-Stuten-Meile was last run in 2007. It was replaced by the Schwarzgold-Rennen, a spring trial for three-year-old fillies, in 2008.

Records
Most successful horse:
 no horse won this race more than once

Leading jockey (2 wins):
 Terence Hellier – Mosquera (2000), Nobilissima (2002)

Leading trainer:
 no trainer won this race more than once

Winners

See also
 List of German flat horse races

References
 Racing Post / siegerlisten.com:
 , 2001, 2004, 
 galopp-sieger.de – Kölner Herbst-Stuten-Meile.
 horseracingintfed.com – International Federation of Horseracing Authorities – Kölner Herbst-Stuten-Meile (2007).
 pedigreequery.com – Kölner Stuten Meile – Köln.

Flat horse races for three-year-old fillies
Horse races in Germany
Recurring sporting events established in 2000
Discontinued horse races
Sport in Cologne